John Cruz is a Master guitar builder (Luthier) who worked for Fender (company) from 1987-2020. Cruz was fired by Fender in 2020 after he made an insensitive post on Facebook. He then launched his own guitar brand called, John Cruz Custom Guitars.

Career
John Cruz, is a former master builder who worked in the Fender Custom Shop. Cruz began working for the Fender company in 1987 and became a master builder in 2003. Two projects that Cruz oversaw were the creation of the Stevie Ray Vaughan replica Stratocaster and the recreation of the 1961 Fiesta Red Stratocaster played by blues guitarist Gary Moore.

In 2020 Cruz was fired after he made a Facebook post that regarding Black Lives Matter protesters. The post was a meme of a bloody jeep with the words: "I don't know what you mean by protestors on the freeway, I came through no problem." 

After leaving Fender in 2020 he started his own guitar company called John Cruz Custom Guitars that same year. He is regularly referred to as a "legendary musical instrument builder". The first 50 guitars he produced were called the ‘Premier Fifty’, and they sold to guitar dealers in less than 24 hours. The new company had to stop taking orders after the demand exceeded production.

Cruz also collaborates with Dean Guitars. In 2021 Cruz was tasked to give the Leslie West signature model a distressed finish.

See also
List of luthiers

References

External links
Video Fender Master Builder Brings Dream Guitars to Life
Video John Cruz Custom Guitars Announcement
John Cruz Custom Guitars

American luthiers
21st-century businesspeople
Guitar makers
American musical instrument makers
Year of birth missing (living people)
Living people